Olufemi Adetokunbo Majekodunmi (born 1 May 1940) is a British-Nigerian architect.

Early life and education 
Olufemi was born on 1 May 1940 in London, England to Moses Majekodunmi and Tomi Agbebi.
However, he grew up in Nigeria and attended St Gregory's College, Lagos He later returned to the United Kingdom to study architecture at the Glasgow School of Art, Kingston College of Art (now Kingston University) and graduated in 1966.

Career
After graduation, Femi worked for some years with firms in Washington, D.C. Afterwards, he returned to Nigeria and worked with Godwin and Hopwood Architects, Lagos before establishing his architectural firm, then Femi Majekodunmi Associates, now FMA Architects Ltd, in Nigeria in 1973. The firm has grown to a large practice, with branch locations in Botswana and South Africa. 
He has worked with various architectural organizations to advance the practice of architecture in countries across Africa. He has been closely associated with many architectural organizations. He was the first president of the Nigerian Institute of Architects, the first secretary of the African Union of Architects and a past president of the International Union of Architects from 1990 to 1993.
He is a Fellow of the Nigerian Institute of Architects and a member of the Royal Institute of British Architects. He has been Juror for several competitions including WAN Awards for World Architecture. He is an Associate Professor of Architecture at the University of Lagos.

Personal life
He is married to Victoria Majekodunmi. They have four children.

See also
 List of Nigerian architects

References

External links
FMA Architects Ltd official website

20th-century British architects
1940 births
Living people
Architects from London
Academic staff of the University of Lagos
Alumni of Kingston University
St Gregory's College, Lagos alumni
21st-century British architects
Yoruba architects
British expatriates in the United States
Yoruba academics
Architecture educators
Nigerian company founders
Yoruba businesspeople
20th-century Nigerian businesspeople
21st-century Nigerian businesspeople
20th-century Nigerian architects
21st-century Nigerian architects
Architects from Lagos
Presidents of the International Union of Architects